Qiangopatrobus is a genus of ground beetles in the family Carabidae. There are at least three described species in Qiangopatrobus, found in China.

Species
These three species belong to the genus Qiangopatrobus:
 Qiangopatrobus andrewesi (Zamotajlov, 1990)  (China)
 Qiangopatrobus dentatus (Zamotajlov & Sawada, 1996)  (China)
 Qiangopatrobus koiwayai (Zamotajlov & Sawada, 1996)  (China)

References

Carabidae